William Livingstone Watson (Kinross, Scotland, 1835-Ayton, Perthshire, Scotland, May 1903) was a Scottish East India merchant and an astronomer.

Early life
Watson was originally intended for a career in the church but turned instead to the law and thence to business. He was educated at the University of Edinburgh and the University of Glasgow.

Career
Watson joined a Glasgow firm of East India merchants, James Finlay & Co., in 1855. He became a partner in this firm in 1865, and in 1876 moved to London, where he was their representative. He also participated in a number of other business activities, serving for many years as chairman of the London board of the Royal Insurance Company, and also on a number of other boards, including the Merchants’ Marine Insurance Company, the Agra Bank, the Indo-China Steam Navigation Company, the Assam Bengal Railway, and the Clan Line.

Astronomy
In 1888 Watson bought Ayton House in Perthshire, Scotland, and with it an observatory and one of the United Kingdom's largest telescopes, the 12-inch "great refractor" that has been exhibited at the Great Exhibition in 1851. He worked on this telescope with astronomers  Ludwig Becker and Ralph Copeland. He was elected a fellow of the Royal Astronomical Society in 1892.

Other activities
Watson was also a Justice of the Peace and a member of the Perthshire County Council. He was a devout Free Church Christian and a strict Sabbatarian, banning non-religious books and children's toys on Sundays. He worked with other temperance campaigners for the introduction of the Gothenburg System for controlling the consumption of alcoholic spirits.

Personal life 
Watson married Elizabeth Lindsay Seton, the daughter of George Seton, a genealogist and historian, in 1878, but his wife suffered from ill health after 1881, and their son R. W. Seton-Watson, the political activist and historian, later recalled that he had never seen his mother walking or standing. The household was run by Watson's sister Jeanie and then by a cousin, Mary Lorimer.

References

1835 births
1903 deaths
Scottish merchants
Scottish astronomers
19th-century Scottish businesspeople